USA-215, also known as NRO Launch 41 or NROL-41, is an American reconnaissance satellite, operated by the National Reconnaissance Office (NRO). Launched in 2010, it has been identified as the first in a new series of imaging radar satellites, developed as part of the Future Imagery Architecture (FIA) programme, to replace the earlier Lacrosse spacecraft.

Launch 
USA-215 was launched by an Atlas V launch vehicle, flying in the 501 configuration, operated by United Launch Alliance (ULA). The rocket was launched from Space Launch Complex 3E at the Vandenberg Air Force Base, at 04:03:30 UTC on 21 September 2010. It was identified as NRO Launch 41, and was the twenty-third flight of an Atlas V; the vehicle had the tail number AV-025, and was named Gladys.

Mission 
The satellite's orbit and mission are officially classified; however, it has been located by amateur observers in a retrograde low Earth orbit.

References 

Spacecraft launched in 2010
National Reconnaissance Office satellites
USA satellites
Space synthetic aperture radar